Bathurst Island is one of the Queen Elizabeth Islands in Nunavut, Canada. It is a member of the Arctic Archipelago. It is uninhabited.

This in turn forms part of the Arctic Cordillera mountain system. Good soil conditions produce abundant vegetation and support a more prolific wildlife population than other Arctic islands.

The island contains both the International Biological Program site Polar Bear Pass and Qausuittuq National Park.

History
The island was first inhabited by Independence I culture native peoples around 2000 BC. They were followed by Independence II, Pre-Dorset, and Dorset cultures. Brooman Point Village on the eastern coast of Bathurst Island was the site of Thule native tribes around AD 1000, conceivably during a warmer climate episode. No modern Inuit resided there at the time of European discovery in the 1800s.  But Inuit in the region likely knew of its abundant wildlife, and possibly travelled there on hunting trips. William Edward Parry was the first European to discover the island in 1819, charting its southern coast. It was named for Henry Bathurst, 3rd Earl Bathurst, British Secretary of State for War and the Colonies 1812–1827. Robert Dawes Aldrich charted much of its west coast in 1851, while George Henry Richards and Sherard Osborn charted its north coast in 1853.

The Earth's North Magnetic Pole tracked northwards across Bathurst and Seymour Islands during the 1960s and 1970s.  The Canadian National Museum of Natural Sciences, led by renowned Arctic biologist Stewart D. Macdonald, Curator of Vertebrate Ethology, established a permanent High Arctic Research Station there in 1973. Located on the Goodsir River in Polar Bear Pass, the station was staffed seasonally until the 1980s.

See also
 Desert island
 List of islands

References

Further reading

 Anglin, Carolyn Diane, and John Christopher Harrison. Mineral and Energy Resource Assessment of Bathurst Island Area, Nunavut Parts of NTS 68G, 68H, 69B and 79A. [Ottawa]: Geological Survey of Canada, 1999.
 Blake, Weston. Preliminary Account of the Glacial History of Bathurst Island, Arctic Archipelago. Ottawa: Department of Mines and Technical Surveys, 1964.
 Danks, H. V. Arthropods of Polar Bear Pass, Bathurst Island, Arctic Canada. Syllogeus, no. 25. Ottawa: National Museum of Natural Sciences, National Museums of Canada, 1980.
 Freeman, Milton M. R., and Linda M. Hackman. Bathurst Island NWT A Test Case of Canada's Northern Policy. Canadian Public Policy, Vol.1,No.3, Summer. 1975.
 Givelet, N, F Roos-Barraclough, M E Goodsite, and W Shotyk. 2003. "A 6,000-Years Record of Atmospheric Mercury Accumulation in the High Arctic from Peat Deposits on Bathurst Island, Nunavut, Canada". Journal De Physique. IV, Colloque : JP. 107: 545.
 Hueber, F. M. Early Devonian Plants from Bathurst Island, District of Franklin. Ottawa: Energy, Mines and Resources Canada, 1971.
 Kerr, J. William. Geology of Bathurst Island Group and Byam Martin Island, Arctic Canada (Operation Bathurst Island). Ottawa: Dept. of Energy, Mines and Resources, 1974.
 F.F. Slaney & Company. Peary Caribou and Muskoxen and Panarctic's Seismic Operations on Bathurst Island, N.W.T. 1974. Vancouver: F.F. Slaney & Co. Ltd, 1975.
 Taylor, William Ewart, and Robert McGhee. Deblicquy, a Thule Culture Site on Bathurst Island, N.W.T., Canada. Mercury series. Ottawa: National Museums of Canada, 1981.

External links
 Bathurst Island in the Atlas of Canada - Toporama; Natural Resources Canada

Islands of the Queen Elizabeth Islands
Uninhabited islands of Qikiqtaaluk Region